Chuwolsan (추월산 / 秋月山) is a mountain of Jeollabuk-do, western South Korea. It has an elevation of 731 metres.

See also
List of mountains of Korea

References

Mountains of South Korea
Mountains of North Jeolla Province
Mountains of South Jeolla Province